Sovkhozny is a rural locality (a settlement) in Grayvoronsky District, Belgorod Oblast, Russia. The population was 90 as of 2010. There are 2 streets.

Geography 
Sovkhozny is located 25 km east of Grayvoron (the district's administrative centre) by road. Gorkovsky and Kazachok are the nearest rural localities.

References 

Rural localities in Grayvoronsky District